Duque appointed all the 16 ministers and high councilors before his inauguration as president, once the inauguration ceremony was over and during his government he induced the creation of two new ministries, derived from the disappeared departments of Coldeportes and Colciencias.

Cabinet

See also 

 Council of Ministers of Colombia

References 

Iván Duque
Presidency of Iván Duque
Government of Colombia
2018 establishments in Colombia
Cabinets established in 2018
August 2018 events in South America
Duque